Yanchi County (Xiao'erjing: يًاچِ ثِيًا) is a county under the administration of Wuzhong city in Ningxia Hui Autonomous Region of the People's Republic of China, bordering the provinces of Shaanxi to the east and Gansu to the south, as well as Inner Mongolia to the north.

Characteristics

Yanchi County is one of China's most impoverished counties. Economic development has been slow, because much of the land in the county is wasteland with alkali soil, making farming difficult. Also, to cancel agricultural taxes on these lands, the county government has in recent years developed the cultivation of honey and high-tech herbs. The town of Huamachi serves as the location for the county government offices. The county's postal code is 751500.

Geography and climate

Administrative divisions
Yanchi County has 4 towns and 4 townships.
4 towns
 Huamachi
 Gaoshawo
 Hui′anbao
 Dashuikeng

4 townships
 Mahuangshan
 Qingshan
 Fengjigou
 Wanglejing

References

County-level divisions of Ningxia
Wuzhong, Ningxia